Michael Best is an American law firm based in Milwaukee, Wisconsin.

Michael Best may also refer to:
 Michael Best (tenor), American operatic tenor
 Michael L. Best, American computer scientist